Bankenviertel (banking quarter) is the name of the central business district in Frankfurt, Germany where many banks, insurance companies, and other financial institutions are located. It is the most important German financial hub, if not one of the largest in Europe along with La Défense in the Paris aire urbaine and London's City and Canary Wharf.

Having no official or strict borders, it is commonly defined as the western part of the Innenstadt, the southern part of the Westend and the eastern part of the Bahnhofsviertel. Its most central square is the Opernplatz.

Location 

The Bankenviertel is not an official city district and has no officially or strictly defined borders. It stretches across three city districts: the western part of the Innenstadt, the southern part of the Westend and the eastern part of the Bahnhofsviertel. Many of the largest banks in Germany, e.g. Deutsche Bank, DZ Bank, Commerzbank and Helaba, have their corporate headquarters here, as well as many representation offices of foreign banks. It is also the place where most of Frankfurts high-rises and skyscrapers are located, which gave it also the nicknames Bankfurt and  Mainhattan.

The heart of the Bankenviertel is located on both sides of the Taunus- and Gallusanlage, an inner-city parkway, and the surrounding streets (Neue Mainzer Straße, Junghofstraße, Kaiserstraße), and the central square of the Bankenviertel is the Opernplatz. Furthermore, the area on both sides of the Mainzer Landstraße from Taunusanlage to Platz der Republik and the Bockenheimer Landstraße, beginning at the Opernplatz, are part of the area.

Financial institutions

Public transport 
The Bankenviertel is very well accessible with the public transport system. Eight of nine suburban S-Bahn lines (S1-S6, S8, S9) serve the stations Hauptwache, Taunusanlage and Frankfurt Central Station. All inner-city U-Bahn lines have stops within the area: U1-U3 at Willy-Brandt-Platz and Hauptwache, U4 and U5 at Willy-Brandt-Platz and Frankfurt Central Station, U6 and U7 at Hauptwache and Alte Oper. The tram lines 11 and 12 stop at Frankfurt Central Station and Willy-Brandt-Platz, and the lines 16 and 17 link the central station and the Frankfurt Trade Fair area.

References 

 
Districts of Frankfurt
Frankfurt am Main
Frankfurt am Main